Heliopsis helianthoides is a species of flowering plant in the family Asteraceae, known by the common names rough oxeye, smooth oxeye and false sunflower. It is native to eastern and central North America from Saskatchewan east to Newfoundland and south as far as Texas, New Mexico, and Georgia.

The toothed leaf blades are oval to triangular or lance-shaped and may be smooth or hairy or rough in texture. The flowers are produced from midsummer to early autumn (fall). The inflorescence contains one to many composite flowerheads. The rays are fertile, having a small forked pistil at the base; this distinguishes them from true sunflowers. At the center are many yellow to brownish disc florets.

In the wild, H. helianthoides may be found in wooded areas and tallgrass prairie, and sometimes along roadsides.

It is a popular garden plant for moist, fertile soil in full sun. Plants grow stiff and tall, so may require staking. Several cultivars are available with flowers of varying colors and shades. These include 'Summer Sun', 'Golden Plume', and 'Prairie Sunset'. The following cultivars of H. helianthoides var. scabra ("rough") have gained the Royal Horticultural Society's Award of Garden Merit:
 'Benzinggold' 
 'Light of Loddon' 
 'Loraine Sunshine'='Helhan' 
 'Sonnenglut'  
 'Spitzentänzerin' 
 'Waterperry Gold'

References

External links

 
 Photo of herbarium specimen at Missouri Botanical Garden, collected in Missouri in 2005

helianthoides
Flora of North America
Plants described in 1753
Taxa named by Carl Linnaeus